Eric I of Saxe-Lauenburg (c.1280–1360) was a member of the House of Ascania who ruled as one of the dukes of Saxony from 1282 until 1338.

Early life 
Eric was a son of John I, Duke of Saxony, and Ingeborg Birgersdotter of Småland (*ca. 1253–30 June 1302*, Mölln), a daughter or grandchild of Birger jarl. Eric's father John I resigned from the ducal throne in 1282 in favour of his sons: Eric I, Albert III, and John II. As they were minors, their uncle Albert II fostered them. Eric and his brothers came to age and joined the government. The last document, mentioning the brothers and their uncle Albert II as Saxon fellow dukes dates back to 1295.

Personal rule 
The definite partitioning of Saxony into Saxe-Lauenburg, jointly ruled by Eric I and his brothers and Saxe-Wittenberg, ruled by their uncle Albert II, took place before 20 September 1296, when the Vierlande, Sadelbande (Land of Lauenburg), the Land of Ratzeburg, the Land of Darzing (later Amt Neuhaus), and the Land of Hadeln are mentioned as the separate territory of the brothers. Albert II received Saxe-Wittenberg around the eponymous city and Belzig.

Eric I and his brothers at first jointly ruled Saxe-Lauenburg, before they partitioned it into three parts, while the exclave Land of Hadeln remained a trilateral condominium. Eric then held Bergedorf (Vierlande) and Lauenburg and inherited the share of his childless brother Albert III, Saxe-Ratzeburg, after he already deceased in 1308 and a retained section from Albert's widow Margaret of Brandenburg-Salzwedel on her death. However, his other brother then claimed a part for him, so in 1321 Eric passed Bergedorf (Vierlande) on to John II, whose share thus became known since as Saxe-Bergedorf-Mölln and Eric's as Saxe-Ratzeburg-Lauenburg.

In 1338 Eric I resigned in favour of his son Eric II. In the course of a feud between Eric II and the neighbouring Duke William of Brunswick and Lunenburg (Celle) the latter's troops expelled Eric I from his castle Riepenburg in Kirchwerder (today's Borough of Bergedorf, Hamburg) and he perished in exile at his granddaughter Jutta in Hoya's capital Nienburg upon Weser.

Marriage and issue
In 1316 or 1318 Eric married Elisabeth of Pomerania (*1291–after 16 October 1349*), daughter of Bogislaw IV, Duke of Pomerania. They had the following four children:

 Eric II (*1318/1320-1368*).
 John I (*?–1372*), Prince-Bishop of Cammin 1344–1372
 Helene (*?–after 1354*), married John II, Count of Hoya-Bruchhausen (*?–1377*); their children were: Eric I, Count of Hoya, John I of Hoya and Otto IV of Hoya
 Jutta (*?–after 1354*), married Gerard III of Hoya-Nienburg (*?–1383*)

Notes

|-

1280 births
1360 deaths
Eric 01
Eric 01